Sub Pop 100 is a rock compilation album, released in July 1986 by the Sub Pop label.

There were only 5000 copies of the compilation made, making it extremely popular amongst collectors.

Track listing
 "Spoken Word Intro Thing" - Steve Albini (0:50)
 "Greatest Gift" - Scratch Acid (2:03)
 "Nothin' to Prove" (Live) - Wipers (2:07)
 "Kill Yr Idols" - Sonic Youth (2:47)
 "Bananacuda" - Naked Raygun (1:41)
 "Gila" - U-Men (2:16)
 "Smile on Your Face" - Dangerous Birds (2:55)
 "Church in Hell" - Skinny Puppy (3:12)
 "Go at Full Throttle" - Steve Fisk (2:29)
 "Itsbeena" - Lupe Diaz (1:14)
 "Impact Test" - Boy Dirt Car (1:22)
 "Real Men" - Savage Republic (3:12)
 "One Day of the Factory" - Shonen Knife (3:55)

See also
Sub Pop 200
Sub Pop 1000

References

Record label compilation albums
1986 compilation albums
Alternative rock compilation albums
Sub Pop compilation albums